Grand Traverse Bay is a deep bay of Lake Michigan formed by the Leelanau Peninsula in the northwestern Lower Peninsula of Michigan. It is further divided into two east and west arms by the Old Mission Peninsula. Grand Traverse Bay is an enclosed bay, and is the second largest bay of Lake Michigan, behind Green Bay.

Etymology 
Grand Traverse Bay earned its name from 18th-century French voyageurs who made , or "the long crossing", across the mouth of bay. The area was owned by the French, followed by Great Britain as the Province of Quebec. After 1776, the area was owned by the Americans. On Old Mission peninsula, Rev Peter Doughtery started the first permanent settlement in 1839. This was called "Grand Traverse", but was later renamed to Old Mission.

Geography 
Traverse City is situated at the south end of the bay where the Boardman River empties into the west arm. Cherry orchards line the bay region, giving rise to Traverse City's claim to be the Cherry Capital of the World. Several nationally known companies offer cherry-based products made with Northern Michigan tart cherries including Traverse Bay Farms, Cherry Central, Fruit Advantage, American Spoon, Cherry Republic and Old Mission Traders (formerly Cherry Stop). The region is the center of cherry production in Michigan.

The most notable feature of the bay is that it is bisected into East and West arms by the Old Mission Peninsula. In addition, Grand Traverse is divided further into several important smaller bays, including Northport Bay, Suttons Bay, Omena Bay, Bowers Harbor, and Old Mission Bay. Northport Bay open to the east, except inside the arms at each end, with the Leelanau Peninsula on the West side. There are several shoals in Northport Bay marked by buoys. Bellow Island, a low gravel island covered by shrubs and located near the middle of Northport Bay, is owned by the Nature Conservancy; it is primarily known as a bird rookery, and is sometimes locally called Gull Island.

There are several marinas on the bay, including the large marinas in Northport, Greilickville, Traverse City, and Elk Rapids.

Communities

Antrim County 

 Antrim City
 Eastport
 Elk Rapids
 Torch Lake

Charlevoix County 

 Norwood

Grand Traverse County 
 Acme
 Old Mission
 Traverse City
 Yuba

Leelanau County 
 Greilickville
 Northport
 Northport Point
 Omena
 Suttons Bay

Arms and nested bays 
The Grand Traverse Bay is divided by the Old Mission Peninsula into two arms:

East Arm 
The East Arm of Grand Traverse Bay (colloquially known as "East Bay") is the deeper of the two arms. The arm is flanked to the west by the Old Mission Peninsula, the south and southeast by mainland Grand Traverse County, and to the east by southwestern Antrim County. The arm's primary inflow is the Elk River, which drains the Chain of Lakes.

West Arm 
The West Arm of Grand Traverse Bay (colloquially known as "West Bay") is the shallower and more urbanized of the two arms. The urban core of Traverse City is located at the head of the West Arm. The arm is flanked to the west by the Leelanau Peninsula, and to the east by the Old Mission Peninsula. Power Island is located within the West Arm. The primary inflow of the West Arm is the Boardman River.

Nested bays 

 Bowers Harbor
 Ingalls Bay
 Northport Bay
 Old Mission Harbor
 Omena Bay
 Suttons Bay

Islands 
Bassett Island
Bellow Island
Power Island

Culture 
Besides cherries, the surrounding countryside produces grapes and is one of the centers of the Michigan wine industry. Known for its shimmering blue water and golden sand beaches, the Grand Traverse Bay region is a popular vacation destination.

The granite rock has markings that resemble a mastodon with a spear in its side. Confirmation that the markings are an ancient petroglyph will require more evidence. The stone can bee seen in a TV documentary, and is pictured on page 9 of New Scientist Magazine of July 19, 2008.

Shipwrecks 
The Grand Traverse Bay is home to the following shipwrecks:

A.J. Rogers
 Metropolis
 Shale Scow
 Yuba Wreck
 Tramp
 Elmwood
 Nyord
 Barge

Notes

References

External links

Michigan Wines Website
Wineries of Old Mission
Leelanau Peninsula Wine Trail
Southwest Michigan Wine Trail
List of cherry farms located in the Traverse Bay Region
Underwater photographs of Grand Traverse Bay's West arm
Watershed Center Grand Traverse Bay
Inland Seas Education Association

Bodies of water of Antrim County, Michigan
Bodies of water of Charlevoix County, Michigan
Bodies of water of Grand Traverse County, Michigan
Bodies of water of Leelanau County, Michigan
Bays of Michigan
Bays of Lake Michigan